Mudali  is a village development committee in Parsa District in the Narayani Zone of southern Nepal. At the time of the 2011 Nepal census it had a population of 5,850 people living in 823 individual households. There were 3,064 males and 2,786 females at the time of census.

References

Populated places in Parsa District